Convolutindole A (2,4,6-tribromo-1,7-dimethoxy-N,N-dimethyltryptamine) is a brominated tryptamine alkaloid that was first identified in 2001 in Amathia convoluta, a marine bryozoan. Bryozoans are aquatic invertebrates that grow in colonies and may resemble coral.

Chemistry
Convolutamine A is the 2,4,6-tribromo-1,7-dimethoxy derivative of DMT, a hallucinogen that occurs naturally in many plants and animals. Convolutamine A is chemically related to 5-bromo-DMT which also occurs in many marine invertebrates.

Until the discovery of convolutindole A, the 1-methoxyindole moiety was unknown in the marine world. 1-Methoxyindoles, such as lespedamine, were previously only known to occur in legumes and the Brassicaceae, the plant family that cabbage and mustard belong to.

Biological activity
This chemical was tested for its ability to kill parasitic nematodes. It was found to be more effective than levamisole, a synthetic drug used to kill parasitic worms and to treat colon cancer.

References

Narkowicz, C. K.; Blackman, A. J., (June 2001). Abstracts of Papers; 10th International Symposium on Marine Natural Products: Nago, Okinawa, Abstract OR1.

Tryptamine alkaloids
Halogen-containing alkaloids
Bromoarenes
Indole ethers at the benzene ring
Hydroxylamines